Elizabeth Lois Shields (née Teare; born 27 February 1928) is a British politician.

Shields studied at the University of York and became a teacher and lecturer. She served as a councillor on Ryedale District Council from 1980 to 2019 for Norton (later Norton East).

Shields contested Howden in 1979 and Ryedale in 1983. Following the death of Ryedale's Conservative MP John Spence in 1986, Shields achieved victory in the Ryedale by-election of 1986, becoming the constituency's first Liberal MP, as part of the Alliance electoral pact between the Liberals and the Social Democrats. However, it was a short-lived success, as the Conservative John Greenway regained Ryedale at the 1987 general election.

Shields stood for Ryedale again in 1992, this time for the Liberal Democrats, who were the successors to the Liberal Party. However, the Conservatives increased their majority.

After previously serving as the Group Leader of the Liberal Democrats on the District Council, she lost her seat to the Conservatives in the 2019 local elections. During 1989–1990 she held the office of Chairman of the District Council. Shields is currently the local Party President of Thirsk and Malton Liberal Democrats.

References
Times Guide to the House of Commons, 1992

Thirsk and Malton Liberal Democrats Executive Committee minutes 2007.
Ryedale District Council - Website

Specific

Further reading
A Year to Remember: Elizabeth Shields, Liberal Democrat Publications, Dorchester, 1995

External links 

Councillor.info personal site

1928 births
Living people
Liberal Party (UK) MPs for English constituencies
Female members of the Parliament of the United Kingdom for English constituencies
Liberal Democrats (UK) councillors
Councillors in North Yorkshire
UK MPs 1983–1987
Alumni of the University of York
Liberal Democrats (UK) parliamentary candidates
20th-century British women politicians
20th-century English women
20th-century English people
Women councillors in England